Cold Lake is a large lake in Central Alberta and Northern Saskatchewan, Canada. It has around 24 known species of fish and is a major ice fishing lake. Cold Lake is also major stop for many migrating birds, and is home to one  of the largest warbler populations in Alberta. A surface of  lies in the province of Alberta.

The city of Cold Lake is located on the shore. Excepting the western shore, the lake is surrounded by protected areas such as the Cold Lake Provincial Park in Alberta and the Meadow Lake Provincial Park in Saskatchewan. The Cold Lake 149 A and B Indian reserves of the Cold Lake First Nations are established on the western and southern shores respectively. Cold Lake House was a trading post built by the Montreal traders in 1781 near present day Beaver Crossing, Alberta, south of Cold Lake.

The Martineau River flows from Primrose Lake into Cold Lake, which in turn discharges through the Cold River. The Cold River travels through a series of lakes in Meadow Lake Provincial Park and ends as it empties into Lac des Îles. The Waterhen River, which is a major tributary of Beaver River, is the primary outflow for Lac des Îles and it continues east where it meets Beaver River, a major tributary of the Churchill River.

The lake has a native legend of a large lake monster kinosoo, of which many residents claimed to see evidence or sightings of. Although some sources claim it has 91m max depth, sonar scans of certain areas of the lake have yielded depths of over 600 feet, and evidence of glacial ice under the lake, would yield an even greater depth if one wanted to count it as water depth as well.

Fish species
Fish species include walleye, sauger, yellow perch, northern pike, lake trout, lake whitefish, cisco, burbot, white sucker, and longnose sucker. Both Alberta and Saskatchewan angling licences are valid on the entire lake.

See also
Ethel Lake
List of lakes of Alberta
List of lakes of Saskatchewan
Tourism in Saskatchewan

References

External links

Beaver River No. 622, Saskatchewan
Municipal District of Bonnyville No. 87
Lakes of Alberta
Lakes of Saskatchewan
Borders of Alberta
Borders of Saskatchewan
North West Company forts
Division No. 17, Saskatchewan